The term Labours of the Months refers to cycles in Medieval and early Renaissance art depicting in twelve scenes the rural activities that commonly took place in the months of the year.  They are often linked to the signs of the Zodiac, and are seen as humankind's response to God's ordering of the Universe.

The Labours of the Months are frequently found as part of large sculptural schemes on churches, and in illuminated manuscripts, especially in the calendars of late medieval Books of Hours.  The manuscripts are important for the development of landscape painting, containing most of the first painting where this was given prominence. The most famous cycle is that painted in the early 15th century by Limbourg brothers in Très Riches Heures du Duc de Berry. In the early 16th century, long after the term was established, the miniaturist Simon Bening produced cycles which link the Limbourgs with the landscape paintings of Pieter Bruegel the Elder.

Typical cycle
The contents of cycles varied with date, location, and the purpose of the work. The Très Riches Heures du Duc de Berry (illustrated right) was designed for the personal use of a great magnate, and was unusually large, allowing all the typical elements to be used in many months. It combines astrological and calendar information at the top, with a combination of the agricultural life of the peasant, the life of the elite courtiers, and illustrations of the Duke's many castles in the background of several scenes.

A typical simple scheme was:

January - Feasting
February - Sitting by the fire
March - Pruning trees, or digging
April - Planting, enjoying the country or picking flowers
May - Hawking, courtly love
June - Hay harvest
July - Wheat harvest
August - Wheat threshing
September - Grape harvest
October - Ploughing or sowing
November - Gathering acorns for pigs
December - Killing pigs, baking

However, there could be many other variations than the above, especially in major wine-growing areas, where more wine related scenes were included. Italian cycles often advance the agricultural scenes a month earlier than the ones from the Low Countries or England.  The impact of the onset of the Little Ice Age has been detected in differences between early and late examples.

Sculpture cycles
 
Most sculptured cycles in Europe, especially when compressed into the archivolt of a portal, consist of an astrological symbol beside, above or incorporated in a sculpture or relief illustrating a monthly labour.

A few sculpted examples of the many surviving are: 
 Chartres cathedral: west and north portal archivolts
 Notre Dame, Paris: northern doorjambs of the west façade (Portal of the Virgin), and a stained glass Zodiacs, labours, vices and virtues cycle filling the west rose window
 Vezelay Abbey: Archivolt of main west basilica doorway
 Autun Cathedral: Archivolt of main west cathedral doorway
 Ferrara Cathedral
 Saint Mark's, Venice: main portal
 San Zeno di Verona: façade
 Lucca Cathedral:  large bas-relief panels with little Zodial signs, to the right and left of the main facade door
 Fontana Maggiore, Perugia: relief panels showing monthly labours are amongst those surrounding the lower basin of the great fountain in front of the Duomo
 Otranto Cathedral: Zodiac signs and labours form part of the mosaic scenes which cover the entire floor
 Canterbury Cathedral: Zodiac signs and monthly labours are amongst the subjects illustrated in large inlaid marble floor medallions on the edge of the Trinity Chapel close to where the shrine of Saint Thomas (Becket) was located
 St Augustine's Church, Brookland, Kent: large cylindrical lead font with reliefs of both Zodiac signs and monthly labours—a rare example in the UK both of such a font and of the combination of zodiac signs and monthly labours
 Carlisle Cathedral: the foliate capitals of the twelve piers of the choir each contain a figure representing one of the labours of the months

Stained glass

The Labours of the months often occur in those rose windows that are dedicated to the Creation, the circular nature of the window suiting the cyclic theme. In these windows, the months are part of a complex iconographical scheme. Other windows have the Labours of the Months specifically as their subject matter.

 Basilica of Saint Denis : rose window of Creation in the north transept.
 Chartres Cathedral : "Labours of the Months" window in south ambulatory

References

Citations

Sources 

 Time in the Medieval World - Occupations of the Months and Signs of the Zodiac in the Index of Christian Art;  Edited by Colum Hourihane - 328 pages | 656 illustrations | 2006 -  | cloth -  | paper
 J. C. Webster, The Labors of the Months in Antique and Mediaeval Art to the End of the Twelfth Century  (Princeton, 1938).
 Bridget Ann Henisch, The Medieval Calendar Year (Pennsylvania State Univ. Press, 1999).

External links 

 Podtours site with info and many images
 Illuminated manuscript examples from the Museum of the Book, The Hague
 Photos of Zodiac and Monthly Labour Imagery in the churches of Britain, France and Italy
The Medieval Year: Zodiac Signs and the Labors of the Months
A comprehensive collection of images at „flickr“
Digitized copy of LJS 499, Medical and astronomical miscellany, 15th Century Germany, from the Philadelphia, University of Pennsylvania, Rare Book & Manuscript Library: Contains zodiac signs and labors of the month.

Medieval art
Renaissance art
Iconography of illuminated manuscripts
Iconography